The 1952–53 Minneapolis Lakers season was the fifth season for the franchise in the National Basketball Association (NBA). The Lakers continued to be the dominant force in the league as they won the Western Division with a 48–22 record. In the playoffs, the Lakers would sweep the Indianapolis Olympians in 2 straight. In the Western Finals, the Lakers would win the first 2 games at home. Against the Fort Wayne Pistons, the Lakers were pushed to a 5th game. The series returned to Minneapolis, where the Lakers won the 5th game 74–58. In the Finals, the Lakers vanquished the New York Knickerbockers for their 2nd straight Championship, and 4th Championship overall in the franchise's first five seasons in the NBA.

Offseason

NBA Draft

Roster

Regular season

Season standings

Record vs. opponents

Game log

Player stats
Note: GP= Games played; REB= Rebounds; AST= Assists; STL = Steals; BLK = Blocks; PTS = Points; AVG = Average

Playoffs

|- align="center" bgcolor="#ccffcc"
| 1
| March 22
| Indianapolis
| W 85–69
| Vern Mikkelsen (18)
| Minneapolis Auditorium
| 1–0
|- align="center" bgcolor="#ccffcc"
| 2
| March 23
| @ Indianapolis
| W 81–79
| Pollard, Mikkelsen (16)
| Butler Fieldhouse
| 2–0
|-

|- align="center" bgcolor="#ccffcc"
| 1
| March 26
| Fort Wayne
| W 83–73
| George Mikan (21)
| Minneapolis Auditorium
| 1–0
|- align="center" bgcolor="#ccffcc"
| 2
| March 28
| Fort Wayne
| W 82–75
| George Mikan (20)
| Minneapolis Auditorium
| 2–0
|- align="center" bgcolor="#ffcccc"
| 3
| March 30
| @ Fort Wayne
| L 95–98
| George Mikan (23)
| War Memorial Coliseum
| 2–1
|- align="center" bgcolor="#ffcccc"
| 4
| April 1
| @ Fort Wayne
| L 82–85
| George Mikan (25)
| War Memorial Coliseum
| 2–2
|- align="center" bgcolor="#ccffcc"
| 5
| April 2
| Fort Wayne
| W 74–58
| Mikan, Martin (18)
| Minneapolis Auditorium
| 3–2
|-

|- align="center" bgcolor="#ffcccc"
| 1
| April 4
| New York
| L 88–96
| George Mikan (25)
| —
| Minneapolis Auditorium5,000
| 0–1
|- align="center" bgcolor="#ccffcc"
| 2
| April 5
| New York
| W 73–71
| George Mikan (18)
| —
| Minneapolis Auditorium4,848
| 1–1
|- align="center" bgcolor="#ccffcc"
| 3
| April 7
| @ New York
| W 90–75
| George Mikan (20)
| —
| 69th Regiment Armory5,100
| 2–1
|- align="center" bgcolor="#ccffcc"
| 4
| April 8
| @ New York
| W 71–69
| George Mikan (27)
| —
| 69th Regiment Armory5,200
| 3–1
|- align="center" bgcolor="#ccffcc"
| 5
| April 10
| @ New York
| W 91–84
| Jim Pollard (17)
| Vern Mikkelsen (6)
| 69th Regiment Armory5,200
| 4–1
|-

Awards and honors
 George Mikan, All-NBA First Team
 Vern Mikkelsen, All-NBA Second Team
 George Mikan, NBA All-Star Game
 Vern Mikkelsen, NBA All-Star Game
 Slater Martin, NBA All-Star Game
 George Mikan, NBA All-Star Game Most Valuable Player Award

References

 Lakers on Database Basketball
 Lakers on Basketball Reference

Los Angeles Lakers seasons
Minneapolis Lakers season
NBA championship seasons
Minnesota Lakers
Minnesota Lakers